Honey, I Shrunk the Kids: The TV Show (truncated to Honey, I Shrunk the Kids in the show's title sequence) is an American syndicated comic science fiction sitcom based on the 1989 film, Honey, I Shrunk the Kids. It expands upon the original film's concept of a shrinking experiment gone wrong to include a myriad of experiments gone awry. It debuted in syndication on September 27, 1997 and ran for three consecutive seasons, concluding with the 66th episode on May 20, 2000.

Peter Scolari took over the role of Wayne Szalinski, the wacky inventor played by Rick Moranis in the original film. Each episode incorporates new technologies and digital effects to feature the family in various new adventures. The series was filmed in Calgary, Alberta, with its main studios located in Currie Barracks, a decommissioned Canadian Forces dormitory.

Episodes

Characters
The Szalinski family are the only returning characters from the films. Wayne Szalinski (Peter Scolari), the show's protagonist, is the husband of Diane and the father of Amy and Nick. The well-meaning Wayne constructs a variety of inventions, including the Shrink-Ray, Neuron Nudger and Brainiactivator among others, that often create predicaments for his family. His wife, Diane Szalinski (Barbara Alyn Woods), is a lawyer. Diane supports Wayne and is very loving, but gets fed up with his antics. The family have a dog, Quark, who is played by Matese in the first season, but by Rusty in seasons two and three.

Amy Szalinski (Hillary Tuck) is the oldest child of Wayne and Diane. She displays the normal teenage angst, but loves her family no matter what. Her younger brother, Nick (Thomas Dekker), is very much like Wayne and also enjoys inventing things. However, unlike his father, he believes in and has an extensive knowledge of the supernatural. He and Amy bicker like most siblings, but generally get along fairly well and will go out of their way for each other when one is in trouble.

The series picks up with the Szalinski household relocating to Matheson, Colorado. Next door to the Szalinskis are the McKennas. Jake McKenna (George Buza) is chief of the police force. He is usually caught up with the Szalinski's mishaps. His younger son, Joel, is one of Nick's friends. His older son, Jack, is an occasional love interest for Amy.

Cast

Main

Recurring

Production history

The Honey, I Shrunk the Kids television series launched in September 1997, shortly after the last film in its namesake trilogy, Honey, We Shrunk Ourselves, was released direct to video. The focus of the television series was on the Szalinski family as they were in the first film, with Wayne and Diane Szalinski living with and raising their children Amy and Nick. The Szalinskis' third child Adam, who was introduced in Honey, I Blew Up the Kid, was never mentioned in the series; it was not clear if the series took place before he was born until the penultimate episode, in which Diane announced she was pregnant which indicated that the show took place between the first film and the sequel.

The film franchise's star Rick Moranis is mentioned briefly in one episode where Amy tells Wayne that he resembles him.  However, Wayne is clueless as to who Moranis is.

After the first season, writers Ed Ferrara and Kevin Murphy left the show. Ed Naha, one of the creators of the original "Honey" film, came aboard as both head writer and co-executive producer for the final two seasons. The second season would also see Stuart Gordon, another of the original film's creators and executive producer of Honey, I Blew Up the Kid, direct an episode ("Honey, Let's Trick or Treat").

The third season saw a precipitous drop in ratings and Disney announced it was ending production after three seasons. The series finale aired on May 20, 2000.

Syndication
Reruns of the series aired on Disney Channel from 2001 to 2006, and aired on The Hub from its launch in 2010 until 2013.

Awards and nominations
Daytime Emmy Awards
1999 – Outstanding Sound Editing – Christopher Harvengt, Kim Naves, James A. Williams, Jason W. Jennings and Tiffany S. Griffith (Nominated) 
2000 – Outstanding Sound Mixing – Bill Thiederman, Dean Okrand, Mike Brooks and Clancy Livingston (Tied with Bill Nye the Science Guy and Bear in the Big Blue House) (won)
2001 – Outstanding Sound Mixing – Clancy Livingston, Dean Okrand, Bill Thiederman and Mike Brooks (won)

See also
Maniac Mansion (TV series), an earlier program with a similar premise, also starring George Buza

References

External links
 
 

1990s American comic science fiction television series
1990s American sitcoms
1997 American television series debuts
2000s American comic science fiction television series
2000s American sitcoms
2000 American television series endings
American fantasy television series
Disney Channel original programming
English-language television shows
First-run syndicated television programs in the United States
Interquel television series
Television shows filmed in Calgary
Television series about size change
Live action television shows based on films
Television series by Disney
Television shows set in Colorado
Honey, I Shrunk the Kids (franchise) mass media
Television series based on Disney films
Television series about families